Mustard tree is a common name for:

Nicotiana glauca
Salvadora persica, native to the Middle East, Africa, and India

See also
 Parable of the Mustard Seed